Psi Beta is a scholastic honor society that recognizes academic achievement among students in the field of Psychology at two-year colleges.

The society was incorporated in Chattanooga, Tennessee on November 5, 1981, and admitted to the Association of College Honor Societies in 1994.

Psi Beta honor society has 129 active chapters across the United States, and a total membership of approximately 38,000.

See also
 Association of College Honor Societies

References

External links
 
  ACHS Psi Beta entry
 Psi Beta chapter list at ACHS

Association of College Honor Societies
Two-year college honor societies
Student organizations established in 1981
1981 establishments in Tennessee